Shabden Park is a   nature reserve in Chipstead in Surrey. It is owned by Surrey County Council and managed by the Surrey Wildlife Trust and is part of the Chipstead Downs Site of Special Scientific Interest.

This is a working farm which has wildflower meadows on chalk grassland together with areas of woodland.  It has a nationally scarce species of mining bee and other fauna include Roesel's bush-cricket and a variety of birds and butterflies.

There is access to footpaths through the farm only.

References

Surrey Wildlife Trust